Banned in Boston was a phrase used to describe an artistic work prohibited from distribution or exhibition in Boston, Massachusetts.

Banned in Boston may also refer to:
 Banned in Boston (GG Allin album), a 1989 album by GG Allin